The University of Connecticut (UConn) is a public land-grant research university in Storrs, Connecticut. It was founded in 1881 as the Storrs Agricultural School, named after two brothers who donated the land for the school. In 1893, the school became a public land grant college, becoming the University of Connecticut in 1939. Over the following decade, social work, nursing and graduate programs were established, while the schools of law and pharmacy were also absorbed into the university. During the 1960s, UConn Health was established for new medical and dental schools. UConn is accredited by the New England Commission of Higher Education.

The university is classified as an R1 research institution. The university has been considered a Public Ivy. UConn is one of the founding institutions of the Hartford/Springfield regional economic and cultural partnership alliance known as New England's Knowledge Corridor. UConn was the second U.S. university invited into Universitas 21, an international network of 24 research-intensive universities who work together to foster global citizenship. 

Competing in the Big East Conference as the Huskies, UConn has been highly successful in their women's and men's basketball programs. The Huskies have won 21 NCAA championships. The UConn Huskies are the top women's basketball program in the nation, having won a record 11 NCAA Division I National Championships (tied with the UCLA Bruins men's basketball team) and a women's record four in a row (2013–2016), plus over 40 conference regular season and tournament championships. UConn also holds the two longest winning streaks of any gender in college basketball history.

History

UConn was founded in 1881 as the Storrs Agricultural School. It was named after Charles and Augustus Storrs, brothers who donated the land for the school as well as initial funding. The Storrs Agricultural Experiment Station was founded in 1887. Women began attending classes in 1891 and were officially admitted in 1893, the same year that it became Connecticut's land-grant college and was renamed Storrs Agricultural College. In 1899, the name changed again to Connecticut Agricultural College, and, in 1933, to Connecticut State College.

On May 26, 1939, Governor Raymond E. Baldwin signed the bill that allowed Connecticut State College to have its name changed to the University of Connecticut. The following year, trustees organized and developed a plan to divide the university into separate schools and colleges in Business, Education, Home Economics, Colleges of Arts and Sciences, and College of Agriculture. This was also the year the School of Social Work and School of Nursing were established. Master's degrees had been awarded since 1920, but the Graduate School was established after the reorganization of the schools in 1940, as well as the Doctoral Program for graduates which was authorized in 1943.  PhDs have been awarded since 1949. The schools of law and pharmacy were also absorbed into the university.

In 1958, the School of Education established the first high school in the town of Mansfield, E. O. Smith High School, as a laboratory school for teacher training and education research. The high school, which lies adjacent to campus, was operated by the University of Connecticut until 1987, when it became the regional public high school. E.O. Smith has maintained an Agricultural Science education program since its time as a part of UConn, and junior and senior high school students may take classes for credit on UConn's campus.

During the 1970s, UConn Health was established in Farmington as a home for the new School of Medicine and School of Dental Medicine. John Dempsey Hospital opened in Farmington in 1975 and has been operated by UConn ever since.

In 1995, a state-funded program called UConn 2000 was passed by the Connecticut General Assembly and signed into law by then-Governor John G. Rowland. This 10-year program set aside $1 billion to upgrade campus facilities, add faculty, and otherwise improve the university. An additional $1.3 billion was pledged by the State of Connecticut in 2002 as part of a new 10-year improvement plan known as 21st Century UConn.

An agreement was reached in 2012 to launch Jackson Laboratory's $1.1 billion genomic medicine lab on the Farmington UConn Health campus as part of the Bioscience Connecticut initiative. In 2013, Governor Dannel P. Malloy signed into law Next Generation Connecticut, committing $1.7 billion in funding over a decade to enhance UConn's infrastructure, hire additional faculty, and upgrade STEM initiatives.

Two sitting U.S. presidents have visited the Storrs campus, Bill Clinton in 1995 and Joe Biden in 2021, to dedicate the first and second iterations of the Dodd Center for Human Rights, respectively. The Dodd Center has brought an array of other world figures to the campus including Madeleine Albright, Elie Wiesel, Oscar Arias, and Mikhail Gorbachev in the fall of 1996. Presidents Gerald Ford and George H. W. Bush visited the campus after holding office.

Campuses

Storrs campus

Libraries
The University of Connecticut Libraries form the largest public research collection in the state. The main library is the Homer D. Babbidge Library, on Fairfield Way in the center of campus. In 1882, Charles Storrs donated the first volumes to the university library collection (specifically, of the agriculture school). The university formerly housed its primary library collections in the Old Whitney building, one of the first agriculture school buildings. The library migrated from Old Main to the basement of Beech Hall in 1929. The university's first librarian was Edwina Whitney, who served from 1900 to 1934. The library then moved to the Wilbur Cross Building and remained there until the 1970s. The current main library, Homer Babbidge, was formerly known as the Nathan Hale Library. It underwent a $3 million renovation that was completed in 1998, making it then the largest public research library in New England.

The Storrs campus is also home to the university's Music and Pharmacy libraries, and the Thomas J. Dodd Research Center, home to the university's archives and special collections, including university records, rare books, and manuscript collections. Each of the regional campuses also have their own libraries, including the Jeremy Richard Library at the Stamford Campus. These libraries are tied into the Babbidge library through a shared catalogue.

The Babbidge-based collection places UConn among the top 30 universities in the nation for library holdings and funding, containing more than 2.5 million print volumes, approximately 2,500 current print periodicals, more than 35,000 unique electronic journals through the eJournal locator, 2.8 million units of microfilm, 180,000 maps at the Map and Geographic Information Center (New England's largest public map collection), millions of electronic books, and an array of free electronic information sources. The UCL also license approximately 265 electronic search databases, many of which contain the full-text of research journals, monographs, and historic documents.

The Lyman Maynard Stowe Library, housed at UConn Health, was one of eight federally funded National Network of Libraries of Medicine libraries from 1991 to 2001. The University of Connecticut School of Law houses the School of Law Library at its campus in Hartford. The Stowe and Law libraries have catalogues separate from the Babbidge system, making the total library holdings of the University of Connecticut much higher than the 2.5 million print volumes of Babbidge. UConn participates in several outside library consortia, including the New England Law Library Consortium and the Northeast Research Libraries Consortium. The Dodd Research Center has also formed a partnership with the African National Congress to share materials with South African scholars.

Campus
The UConn campus at Storrs is home to the Connecticut Repertory Theatre (CRT) run by the Department of Dramatic Arts. The theatre complex has three venues, the 486-seat Harriet S. Jorgensen Theatre, the 241-seat Nafe Katter Theatre, and the 116-seat Studio Theatre. CRT is a member of the Theatre Communications Group, the national service organization for the professional theatre. The Storrs campus also houses the J. Louis von der Mehden Recital Hall, the William Benton Museum of Art, and the Ballard Institute and Museum of Puppetry. UConn is the only institution in the United States that offers a master's degree in puppetry.

Among the research facilities on campus is the George Safford Torrey Life Sciences Building, one of the primary sites of biology research and education at UConn. Built in 1961, in 1980 the building was named in honor of Torrey, former head of the university's botany department. Torrey, who came to Connecticut Agricultural College in the fall of 1915 to teach botany, became head of the Department of Botany in 1929 and served in that role until 1953. A collection of his papers, including notebooks, correspondence, memoranda, administrative records, reports, photographs, and various types of slides and filmstrips are housed in the Archives & Special Collections at the Thomas J. Dodd Research Center. The Torrey Life Sciences Building houses offices for the Department of Ecology and Evolutionary Biology, the Department of Physiology and Neurobiology, the Department of Molecular and Cell Biology, and Biology Central Services.

Because it is situated in a fairly rural area, the UConn campus at Storrs has facilities that allow it to be virtually self-sufficient. All heat on campus is steam, and where possible sidewalks were laid over the underground connectors to keep the snow off. In 2005, a cogeneration plant was activated, which generates most of the electricity for the campus, and uses the exhaust steam for the campus central heating system. The university owns its own public water system and waste water treatment facility. With the support of a growing number of industry leaders based in Connecticut, UConn is at the forefront of developing clean, alternative sources of renewable energy using fuel cell technology. In April 2012, UConn commissioned a fuel cell power plant at its Depot Campus that will supply the campus with clean and efficiency energy, cooling and heating. The installation of a ClearEdge Power, former UTC Power, PureCell System is the latest step by UConn to reduce its carbon footprint and build a sustainable community. The fuel cell installation was made possible through a federal stimulus grant from Connecticut's Clean Energy Finance and Investment Authority (now the Connecticut GreenBank) .

The University of Connecticut Police Department is a fully functional police agency with the same statutory authority as any municipal police department in the State of Connecticut. State and internationally accredited, the department is responsible for protecting lives and property at the University of Connecticut and all adjacent areas within the jurisdiction of the UConn Police Department. This includes the main campus in Storrs and the regional campuses. The UConn Division of Public Safety also includes the UConn Fire Department, and Office of the Fire Marshal and Building Inspectors. The UConn Storrs campus is equipped with a blue-light system which allows students to press an emergency button which will notify the police to come to that location.

UConn 2000 was a public-private partnership to rebuild, renew and enhance the University of Connecticut from 1995 to 2005, funded by the State of Connecticut. UConn 2000 was enacted by the Connecticut General Assembly in 1995 and signed into law by Governor John G. Rowland. The construction projects were overseen by President Philip E. Austin. The legislature renewed the construction investments through 21st Century UConn, the continuation of UConn 2000, which is another billion dollar construction investment by the state to upgrade facilities at the University of Connecticut. It passed the Connecticut General Assembly and was signed into law by Governor Rowland in 2002. By the time of the project's completion, every building on campus will be new or completely renovated. Money has also been put into the regional and satellite campuses, including the new School of Business facilities in downtown Hartford.

Next Generation Connecticut is a multi-faceted $1.5 billion plan to build the state's economic future through strategic investments in science, technology, engineering, and math disciplines (STEM). It passed the Connecticut General Assembly and was signed into law by Governor Dannel Malloy in June 2013. The funds will be used over a 10-year period to hire 250+ new faculty, increase undergraduate enrollment by 6,580 students, and upgrade aging campus infrastructure. Money has also been allocated to build new STEM facilities, construct new STEM teaching laboratories and to create a premier STEM honors college. NextGenCT will also allow for the construction of student housing and a digital media center at the Stamford campus, and allow for the relocation of the Greater Hartford campus back to downtown Hartford.

Avery Point campus
UConn's Avery Point campus overlooks Long Island Sound in the town of Groton. It is home to the National Undersea Research Center, the Connecticut Sea Grant College, Project Oceanology, the Long Island Sound Resource Center, and the Alexey von Schlippe Gallery of Art. The campus has undergone an extensive transformation in recent years, including new Marine Science and Project Oceanology buildings, a new research vessel, and renovations of the Branford House, the gymnasium, and the main Academic Building.

The campus was formerly the summer home of Morton Freeman Plant, a 19th-century railroad, steamship, and hotel magnate. Branford House was his mansion overlooking Long Island Sound, reportedly worth $3 million when it was completed in 1904. Also located on the property was a caretaker's house (the current police station) and a barn and horse stable (the current physical plant buildings). The estate included what is now the Shennecossett Public Golf Course located just north of the campus, which was turned over to the State of Connecticut in the 1930s. During World War II, the remaining portion of the Plant estate was leased to the Coast Guard as a training center, and the Avery Point Light was built. In 1967, it was converted into the Southeastern Campus of the University of Connecticut, later renamed the University of Connecticut at Avery Point.

Students have access to classes for all of UConn's traditional majors, as well as the Bachelor of General Studies (BGS). There are three other majors that can be completed at the Avery Point campus besides the BGS degree: Coastal Studies, Maritime Studies, and American Studies. Graduate programs are also offered in STEM Teacher Education, Engineering, and Nursing.

Stamford campus
In 1951, the University of Connecticut began offering extension courses at the former Stamford High School to provide education for GIs returning from the Korean War. In the fall of 1952, the university formally established a regional campus in Stamford. Upon inception, UConn's Stamford Campus offered five courses — English, Mathematics, History, Speech, and Sociology, and enrolled 21 part-time students.

A newly constructed UConn Stamford Campus opened in 1962 on Scofield Town Road, and a separate library building was added in 1974. Also in the mid-1970s, the academic program was expanded to provide a four-year degree in several fields of study.

In 1990, planning began for a new UConn Stamford Campus in the heart of downtown Stamford. One of the first UConn 2000 building projects, the new campus opened in 1998, offering a variety of academic programs including undergraduate and graduate degrees. The contemporary glass-enclosed campus features a high-tech approach to learning with internet access in classrooms, laboratories, student amenities and public spaces. Design for the new UConn building was led by Aaron Schwarz, then of Perkins Eastman.

In collaboration with area businesses, UConn's Stamford Campus established the Connecticut Information Technology Institute that provides IT professional development and cyber-business research.

The Stamford Campus of the University of Connecticut offers complete undergraduate degree programs in thirteen majors as well as the Bachelor of General Studies Degree Program. Majors are American Studies, Business Administration (BSBA), Business Data Analytics (BSBDA), Financial Management (BSFM), Digital Media and Design (BA) and (BFA), Economics, English, Human Development and Family Sciences, History, Political Science, Psychology, and a Certificate Entry into Nursing (CEIN/BS), an accelerated pre-licensure program. At the graduate level, Masters of Business Administration (MBA), Masters of Business Analytics and Project Management (MSBAPM) and an MS in Financial Risk Management are offered.

In August 2017, UConn's first-ever permanent residence hall for students outside the Storrs campus was opened at Stamford. The six-story, 116 unit building is intended to house 290 students.

Hartford campus
In August 2017, UConn formally opened its new campus in downtown Hartford, after nearly 40 years in neighboring West Hartford. The new campus is located within Hartford's Front Street neighborhood, a portion of the Adriaen's Landing project. The centerpiece of the new campus is the historic Beaux-Arts former headquarters of the Hartford Times.

UConn Hartford offers a wide range of liberal arts and sciences courses and degrees to over 1,400 undergraduate and more than 600 graduate students. Students pursue undergraduate degrees in American Studies, Business and Technology, Business Administration, English, General Studies, Human Development and Family Sciences, Psychology, and Urban and Community Studies. The Center for Continuing Studies provides a number of certificate program options, in addition to the Bachelor of General Studies, an interdisciplinary degree program tailored to meet individual needs and goals of returning, non-traditional, part-time adult students.

Due to the UConn Hartford's proximity to the State Capitol and legislative offices, the university's Department of Public Policy (DPP) is based at the Hartford campus. The DPP offers a Master of Public Administration, Master of Public Policy, Master of Arts in Survey Research, and four graduate level certificates. The university's School of Social Work is also located at the Hartford campus and offers a Master of Social Work and PhD in Social Work. UConn Hartford also offers the one-year Master of Education with Teacher Certification Program for college graduates.

Located at Constitution Plaza in downtown Hartford, UConn's Graduate Business Learning Center (GBLC) is home to the UConn School of Business full-time, part-time and Executive MBA program along with master's programs in Business Analytics and Project Management (MSBAPM), Financial Risk Management (FRM), as well as the SS&C Technologies Financial Accelerator. The center was remodeled in 2004 to create a state-of-the-art facility featuring the latest technology. The university has announced that the GBLC will be expanding in Constitution Plaza in 2017 as a result of capacity issues in the future Front Street campus.

Waterbury campus
In 1942, the University of Connecticut was invited to Waterbury at the request of a group of citizens, headed by the Waterbury YMCA. Named the Waterbury Extension Center, it offered primarily certificate-granting technical courses taught at the YMCA for 253 students who were mostly of returning veterans looking for an affordable and easily accessible means of earning and education. Gradually, as the demand for courses grew, and enrollment increased, certain facilities at Leavenworth High School were used. Each semester about a dozen undergraduate courses were offered and a sizeable non-credit program was added. Four years later in the fall of 1946, the local Advisory Committee, working with the local Board of Education, secured the Begnal School on Charles Street to address the growing need for space created by the increased demands for higher education.

In addition to the facilities on Charles Street, the Central YMCA allocated some space in their building for evening classes. The enrollment during this period increased to 662 students in the fall of 1947 and the establishment of an accredited, full-time undergraduate program, at the newly designated Waterbury Branch of the University of Connecticut. Students were able to take the comprehensive Freshman and Sophomore programs in Arts and Sciences, Business Administration, and Engineering as well as Continuing Education for adults. Classes continued to be held at the Begnal School until 1955. At that time, due in large part to local citizen groups, the City of Waterbury and the State of Connecticut, a new four-acre campus at 32 Hillside Avenue was provided. At first, classes and administration were housed together in the Benedict-Miller House at the center of the property. As the need for more space continued to strain the existing facilities, more buildings were added to the site, including a sixteen-room classroom building, a library, as well as a building housing the science and engineering curriculum, bookstore and cafeteria. In 1971, a garrison colonial on Buckingham Street was purchased and became the new home of the campus administration.

In August 2003, the Waterbury campus moved to a new 95,000 square foot downtown campus. The U-shaped, three-story building at the intersection of East Main Street and Phoenix Avenue was designed to serve more than 1,200 students, faculty and staff, replacing the collection of buildings and houses that has served the Waterbury campus for decades. The new facility was dedicated on October 9, 2003. In January 2016, UConn Waterbury dedicated the newly renovated St. Patrick's Hall also known as the Rectory as the newest addition to its campus. The Rectory Building added two floors of classroom and office space with the fourth floor of the building serving as both a classroom and event space.

The University of Connecticut's Waterbury campus serves more than 1,000 students annually and offers nine four-year undergraduate degrees in Allied Health Sciences, American Studies, Business Administration, Business Data Analytics, English, Human Development and Family Sciences, Psychological Sciences, Urban and Community Studies and a bachelor's degree in General Studies for adults.

Torrington campus
The University of Connecticut at Torrington, founded in 1957, was closed May 2016 due to low enrollment numbers.

Bioscience Connecticut
In June 2011, the Connecticut General Assembly approved legislation for Bioscience Connecticut, a plan proposed by Connecticut Gov. Dannel P. Malloy to jump-start the Connecticut economy.

According to the proposal, Bioscience Connecticut will result in the creation of 3,000 construction jobs annually from 2012 through 2018 and a $4.6 billion increase in personal income by 2037, while generating more than 16,000 jobs. The initiative includes plans for renovations to existing facilities on the UConn Health campus in Farmington, as well the construction of a new patient tower and ambulatory care facility, and seeks to increase UConn Health's medical and dental school enrollments by 30 percent.

Jackson Laboratory
In January 2012, Gov. Malloy announced that Jackson Laboratory (JAX) had reached an agreement to launch a $1.1 billion genomic medicine laboratory on the campus of UConn Health. The laboratory is an independent, nonprofit biomedical research institution based in Bar Harbor, Maine.

According to the agreement, Jackson Laboratory will enter into a collaborative research agreement with UConn Health and will create at least 300 positions within 10 years, 30 percent of total employees being senior scientist positions. Once fully developed, the facility is projected to employ 600 scientists and technicians. The state of Connecticut has approved $291 million of the total capital and research budget; Jackson Laboratory will raise the balance of $860 million through federal research grants, philanthropy, and service income.

Academics

Undergraduate
Students at UConn can pursue over 100 majors, eight undergraduate degrees, 17 graduate degrees and five professional degree programs. Students choose from 87 different minors at UConn, including areas of study not offered as formalized majors.

UConn participates in the New England Board of Higher Education's Regional Student Program (NERSP), allowing students from the five other New England states to enroll at the university at a reduced out-of-state tuition rate if their intended major is not offered by one of their in-state universities. The university also participates in a special guaranteed admissions program with the Connecticut Community Colleges (CCC) that is designed for academically qualified students who are attending a Connecticut community college and who are planning to transfer to the University of Connecticut in Liberal Arts & Sciences, Agriculture, Health & Natural Resources, Business, or Engineering. Each year, more than 1,000 transfer students are admitted to the university.

Admissions
, of the entering freshman at the main campus in Storrs, 54% ranked in the top tenth of their high school class and 89% in the top quarter. UConn's retention rate is among the best for public universities in the nation, with 93% of students returning for their sophomore year. UConn ranks third out of 58 public research universities on basis of graduation time, with the average time to graduate being 4.2 years among those who graduate within 6 years.

Graduate and postgraduate
Bachelor's, master's, and doctoral programs are offered through the College of Liberal Arts and Sciences, College of Agriculture, Health, and Natural Resources, the Graduate School, the Neag School of Education, the School of Nursing, the School of Business, the School of Dental Medicine, the School of Medicine, the School of Engineering, the School of Social Work, the Ratcliffe Hicks School of Agriculture, the School of Pharmacy, the School of Law and the School of Fine Arts. A number of graduate degree programs span multiple schools and colleges, such as the Master of Science in Energy and Environmental Management and the Master of Science in Data Science. These programs take an interdisciplinary approach.

Founded in 1921, the University of Connecticut School of Law is accredited by the American Bar Association and is a member of the Association of American Law Schools. The campus is located just outside the downtown core of Hartford, minutes away from the Connecticut State Capitol, state courts and agencies, and the offices of Hartford's law firms and corporations. Law students have ready access to all of these institutions for study, externships, clinical education, practice, and employment. The campus is listed on the National Register of Historic Places. Its gothic-style buildings, constructed in 1925 (except for the new library, which was completed in 1996), housed the Hartford Seminary until 1981.

The law school has approximately 325 students and a student:faculty ratio of 4.1:1. UConn Law has repeatedly been ranked the top public law school in New England by U.S. News & World Report, and was most recently in 2020 ranked 52nd of American law schools. There are four scholarly journals edited on campus: the Connecticut Law Review, the Connecticut Public Interest Law Journal, the Connecticut Insurance Law Journal, and the Connecticut Journal of International Law.  The school is particularly known for its strong insurance law and intellectual property law programs.

The UConn Health campus in Farmington is home to the School of Medicine, the School of Dental Medicine, John Dempsey Hospital and faculty practices in medical and dental health care. The Lyman Maynard Stowe Library, which is housed at UConn Health, was one of eight federally funded National Network of Libraries of Medicine libraries from 1991 to 2001.

Research
According to the National Science Foundation, UConn spent $269 million on research and development in 2018, ranking it 88th in the nation. In 2005, UConn ranked 64th in terms of R&D expenditure.

Rankings and reputation

The university was ranked tied for 23rd among public universities in the U.S. and tied for 63rd among national universities in 2021 by U.S. News & World Report.
 Kiplinger's Personal Finance named UConn the 33rd best value in public higher education for 2019 (26th on the basis of out-of-state tuition).
 The University of Connecticut was among the top 10 producers of Fulbright Scholars from research institutions in 2017.
 The 2015 Sierra Club "Cool Schools" list of environmentally responsible universities ranked UConn eighth in the U.S.
The University of Connecticut is accredited by the New England Commission of Higher Education.

Student life

Campus safety
In 2014, University of Connecticut and Brown University,  had the highest "total of reports of rape" on their main campus, with 43 reports of rape. According to victim advocates, the reporting of these incidents was a positive development, demonstrating that sexual assault victims were comfortable stepping forward. In recent years, the University of Connecticut has invested in awareness and prevention of sexual assault by forming a special victims unit, establishing a victim support service, and creating a revised training program to teach how to deal with cases of sexual misconduct. As a result, a study conducted by the Higher Education Data Sharing Consortium showed that rates of sexual violence at the University of Connecticut are lower than the national average.

Student organizations
There is a wide variety of student organizations on campus, including fraternities and sororities, musical groups, and religious, athletic, political, cultural, business, military, artistic, and community service clubs. There are also student organizations set up with the intent of governing student life itself, the Undergraduate Student Government, the Interfraternity Council, the Panhellenic Council, UConnPIRG, Residence Hall Association, and the various residence hall councils.

The university's programming board, the Student Union Board of Governors (SUBOG), plans the largest students events on campus. The organization is completely student run and plans events like the annual concerts, Homecoming, One Ton Sundae, weekly movies, and hosts a range of comedians and speakers each month.

The university's daily student-run newspaper, The Daily Campus, is the largest student newspaper in the state of Connecticut. The university has a Huskyvision cable network, channels 14 and 16 at the university. Channel 14 is UCTV, a cable TV network consisting of student-made public-access television shows. The university also has a student-run community radio station, WHUS, which broadcasts at 91.7FM from the UConn Student Union. Many of the students who work for UConn's student media organizations also major in journalism. The University of Connecticut Department of Journalism is the only nationally accredited journalism program in New England.

Storrs Downtown Center has been a popular area for UConn students, nearby residents, and visitors. It is a long-term construction project that continues to open new stores. It is a mixed-use town center that includes retail shops, restaurants, offices, and housing, situated on Connecticut Route 195 across from the UConn campus. Some new features include a new Price Chopper supermarket, family oriented restaurants, and an extension of the UConn Co-op bookstore.

While many area activities are held on campus, the university provides free local bus transportation and also arranges frequent bus trips to Boston, Manhattan, and the Connecticut shoreline. The main university campus also includes museums, theaters, and performing arts venues such as the Jorgensen Center for the Performing Arts, the J. Robert Donnelly Husky Heritage Sports Museum, the William Benton Museum of Art, the Ballard Institute and Museum of Puppetry and the Connecticut State Museum of Natural History. The UConn Dairy Bar was started circa 1953. It remains open year-round and is well known for its ice cream, with roughly 200,000 customers visiting annually.

Symbols
Until 1933, the mascot of UConn had been the "Aggies", because of the university's original agricultural nature. In 1933, the university changed its name from Connecticut Agricultural College to Connecticut State College. To reflect this change, athletic teams were then known as the "Statesmen". In December 1934, the Husky was chosen as the mascot. All UConn huskies are named "Jonathan" in honor of Jonathan Trumbull. The current "real" Jonathan is Jonathan XIV; he is often seen greeting fans and eating dog biscuits at sporting events. Jonathan is one of the few university mascots in the nation to have been selected by students via a popular poll. A statue of Jonathan can also be found outside near the entrances to Gampel Pavilion and the natatorium. This statue, by artist Larry Waisele, was dedicated in 1995. Students are known to rub its nose for good luck.

The University has three official songs. 

The UConn fight song, officially titled "UConn Husky" but commonly called "The Husky Fight Song",was written by Herbert A. France and is one of the most recognizable in the country, played by the Pride of Connecticut during nationally televised sporting events. An audio presentation of the song is available on the UConn Alumni Association website. A full history of the song can be found on the UConn Advance website.

"Fight On Connecticut", written by UConn alum Lawrence A. Cohen ('70), is also played during all athletic events. It's the song the Marching Band plays as it marches up the field in its Block C formation during football pre-game ceremonies and during all other athletic games and rallies. The song's lyrics and a video of the pre-game performance can be found at https://band.uconn.edu/history-tradition/uconn-songs/

"Old Connecticut" is UConn's Alma Mater. It was written by UConn alum Alice Sawin Davis ('25). A version performed by the UCMB with lyrics can be found at https://uconn.edu/share-youtube.

The official colors of the University of Connecticut are blue and white, with red accents included on athletic uniforms.

Traditions

Coated with thousands of layers of paint over the decades, "The Rock" is a student tradition dating back to the late 1940s. Students repeatedly paint it to promote student events, including dances, pep rallies, student elections, parades, fraternity and sorority functions and a host of other campus activities. The current rock is a portion of a much larger outcropping that was originally located across from the North Campus quadrangle and removed for construction of the Life Sciences building in 1958. Forty years later it was put into storage during the UCONN 2000 construction program. The Rock was relocated to its present site in 2008.

UConn officials measured the paint's depth with a small drill in fall 2018 and determined 1.25 inches of paint had accumulated on the rock since it was returned to the site in 2008.

OOzeball is UConn's annual mud volleyball tournament. Each year over 1,000 players and spectators come out to watch UConn's finest get "down and dirty." 2012 marked the 29th running of OOzeball, making it the longest running tournament of its kind in the nation.

Lip Sync is one of UConn's signature Homecoming events, in which teams from the Cultural Centers and Greek organizations compete in a high-energy lip syncing contest. Each team choreographs a routine set to popular songs, and performs in front of thousands of fans in Gampel Pavilion.

The annual Spring Concert organized by the Student Union Board of Governors (SUBOG) has attracted top artists and bands such as Outkast and Third Eye Blind in 2000, Guster and Nelly in 2001, Fat Joe and Nine Days in 2002, 50 Cent and Busta Rhymes in 2003, Ludacris and Kanye West in 2004, Nas and Fabolous in 2005, O.A.R. in 2006, Dashboard Confessional, Reel Big Fish and The Starting Line in 2007, Method Man, Redman, Flo Rida and T-Pain in 2008, 50 Cent and Naughty by Nature in 2009, Jack's Mannequin and KiD CuDi in 2010, B.o.B and Far East Movement in 2011, Wiz Khalifa in 2012, Kendrick Lamar and Steve Aoki in 2013, J Cole in 2014, ASAP Ferg and Schoolboy Q in 2015, Fetty Wap in 2016, and Khalid and PnB Rock in 2018. SUBOG planned to host Lil Uzi Vert and Aminé in 2017 but due to a tropical storm grounding all flights in the area, the show needed to be cancelled. It is known for sizable outdoor parties which historically draw more than 10,000 attendees.

Fraternities and sororities
Since 2003, UConn has established university-owned Greek housing in the "Husky Village", created an Office of Fraternity and Sorority Life, and hired full-time staff to administer the Greek Life program.

Athletics

The University of Connecticut athletic teams are nicknamed the "Huskies" and compete at the NCAA's Division I level and in the Football Bowl Subdivision. UConn moved to the American Athletic Conference in most sports in 2013; the Huskies were a charter member of The American when it was founded in 1979 as the original Big East Conference, and were the only remaining charter member of that league. In 2019, UConn accepted a formal invitation to join the Big East Conference following a unanimous vote of the conference's members. The Huskies will begin playing in the Big East in the 2020–2021 season in all twenty sports except for football and men's/women's ice hockey. UConn men's ice hockey became a full member of Hockey East in 2014–15. The women's hockey team will remain in the Hockey East as well, as they were founding conference members in 2002 when the league began women's ice hockey competition. The football program will not be returning to the AAC and will begin play as an FBS Independent starting in the 2020–2021 season. Regardless of football conference affiliation, the school has publicly committed to competing in the NCAA Division I Football Bowl Subdivision for the foreseeable future. This will make UConn the only member of the Big East to compete at the highest level of college football.

Many UConn student-athletes have gone on to succeed at the professional level, including Ray Allen, Josh Boone, Caron Butler, Andre Drummond, Rudy Gay, Richard Hamilton, Tony Hanson, Jeremy Lamb, Shabazz Napier, Emeka Okafor, Charlie Villanueva and Kemba Walker in the NBA; Sue Bird, Swin Cash, Tina Charles, Stefanie Dolson, Bria Hartley, Maya Moore, Renee Montgomery, Rebecca Lobo Katie Lou Samuelson, Breanna Stewart and Diana Taurasi in the WNBA; Donald Brown, Tyvon Branch, Darius Butler, Will Beatty, Nick Giaquinto, Obi Melifonwu, Byron Jones, and Dan Orlovsky in the NFL; Walt Dropo, Charles Nagy and George Springer in the MLB; and Kevin Burns, Shavar Thomas, O’Brian White, Andre Blake, Carlos Alvarez, Sergio Campbell, Tony Cascio, Josh Ford and Mamadou Doudou Diouf in the MLS. UConn men's basketball player Emeka Okafor (2004) and women's basketball players Rebecca Lobo (1995), Maya Moore (2011) were named the National Academic All-Americans of the Year by the College Sports Information Director of America as seniors.

UConn student-athletes graduate at a higher rate than the general student body and many teams and individuals have won honors for academic excellence.

UConn is well known for its men's and women's basketball teams, both of which are considered among the best programs in the country. The men's basketball teams have won four National Championships (1999, 2004, 2011 and 2014) while the women's basketball teams have won eleven National Championships (1995, 2000, 2002, 2003, 2004, 2009, 2010, 2013, 2014, 2015 and 2016) and have played in a total of 19 NCAA Final Fours, including nine in a row. The women's team went undefeated in the 1995, 2002, 2009, 2010, 2014 and 2016 seasons and ended a 111-game winning streak in the 2017 NCAA Division I women's basketball tournament.

UConn is the only Division I school to sweep the men's and women's basketball titles in the same year, and has done it twice: in 2004 (earning Storrs the nickname "Basketball Capital of the World") and 2014.

The university elevated its football program to the Football Bowl Subdivision in 2002, although the school first fielded a team in 1896. UConn became the quickest program to go from FBS elevation to a Bowl Championship Series game when it played in the 2011 Tostitos Fiesta Bowl. UConn has now played in a total of six bowl games. With the growth of the football program, in 2003 UConn football moved to 38,000-seat Rentschler Field in East Hartford, CT to host its home games.

In addition, the UConn men's soccer team has won three national championships, in 1948, 1981 and 2000, while the women's soccer team advanced to the National Championship title game in 1984, 1990, 1997 and 2003. UConn is also a blue chip program in field hockey, where it has advanced to the national semifinals 16 times, winning national championships in 1981, 1985, 2013, 2014, and 2017 as an associate member of the Big East conference. The Husky baseball team has played in the College World Series five times, and participated in the 2011 NCAA Super Regionals. The Husky baseball team won the 2013 Big East Championship in Florida, defeating the Notre Dame Fighting Irish.

UConn's Husky logo underwent a significant redesign which was unveiled in April 2013. The updated logo, designed by Nike, has appeared on all athletic uniforms since the fall 2013 season.

Alumni

See also 

 XL Center in Hartford, second home of both basketball teams and home of the men's hockey team
Pratt & Whitney Stadium at Rentschler Field in East Hartford, home to the football team
J. O. Christian Field, home to baseball team
Mark Edward Freitas Ice Forum, home to the women's hockey team and former home of the men's hockey team
Morrone Stadium, on campus stadium, home to men's and women's soccer teams
University of Connecticut Historic District, a historic district encompassing the historic core of the Storrs campus
Long River Review, University of Connecticut's literary review magazine

Notes

References

External links

 
 UConn Athletics website

 
Educational institutions established in 1881
Land-grant universities and colleges
Mansfield, Connecticut
University of Connecticut
Universities and colleges in Tolland County, Connecticut
Flagship universities in the United States
1881 establishments in Connecticut